Stowmarket railway station is on the Great Eastern Main Line (GEML) in the East of England, serving the town of Stowmarket, Suffolk. It is also the junction where the Ipswich to Ely Line joins the GEML. Its three-letter station code is SMK.

The station is currently operated by Abellio Greater Anglia, which also runs all trains that serve the station.

History

Opening (1846-1862)
The station was opened by the Ipswich & Bury Railway in 1846 with red brick main buildings in a flamboyant Jacobean manner by Frederick Barnes.

Building the railway from Ipswich to Bury St Edmunds proved challenging.  When the Eastern Union Railway opened the line to Ipswich Stoke Hill railway station in 1846 this was located south of the existing tunnel. The Ipswich and Bury Railway built the tunnel which proved a challenge and then a further challenge awaited the railway's engineers at Stowmarket area where local marsh swallowed up a lot of material with test probes finding the bog was 80 feet deep! The railway employed George Stephenson's solution for the Chat Moss bog (a mere 40 feet deep) and a raft of brushwood and faggots was used to give the embankment a firm footing. The River Gipping was also diverted to aid the project.

On 26 November 1846 the first test train ran to Bury St Edmunds with stops at most stations on the route, accompanied by the inevitable lavish celebrations.  The official opening followed on 7 December 1846 when a special train ran from Shoreditch (later Bishopsgate railway station) to a temporary station at Bury St Edmunds. The Board of Trade inspection took place on 15 December 1846 and the line opened for traffic on 24 December.

The IBR and the EUR (they shared most of the directors anyway)  were worked as one concern from 1847 and the following year the line from Haughley Junction (just north of Stowmarket) and Norwich opened in stages: from Haughley to Finningham (4 miles) on 7 June 1848, from Finningham to Burston (11 miles) on 2 July 1849 and finally through to Norwich Victoria (18½ miles) on 1 December 1849. Stowmarket now had links to Bury St Edmunds and Norwich.

The EUR was in financial trouble and effectively hemmed in by the Eastern Counties Railway (ECR) making further expansion difficult. Following negotiations in 1853, The ECR took over the working of the EUR (and thus Stowmarket station) on 1 January 1854, a situation formally sanctioned by the Act of 7 August 1854.

1854 also saw the completion of the link from Bury St Edmunds to Cambridge thus linking Ipswich and Stowmarket to Cambridge.
By the 1860s the railways in East Anglia were in financial trouble, and most were leased to the ECR; they wished to amalgamate formally, but could not obtain government agreement for this until 1862, when the Great Eastern Railway was formed by amalgamation. Thus Stowmarket became a GER station in 1862.

Great Eastern Railway (1862-1922)
The line from Chippenham Junction to Snailwell Junction near Newmarket opened on 1 April 1880 giving Stowmarket a direct link to Ely and the Midlands. From 1883 the North Country Continental used this route to Manchester.

Up until 1913 all shunting was performed by either the train locomotive or horses. From that year a local shunting engine was employed additionally and this also covered shunting duties at nearby Needham Goods Yard.

Additional sidings were installed during World War One for the increased demand in explosive traffic and both the down and up side goods facilities remodelled.

London & North Eastern Railway (1923-1947)

Following the Railways Act 1921 Stowmarket station was operated by the London and North Eastern Railway from 1 January 1923.
During the mid-1920s the LNER rebuilt the two track timber goods shed and a number of industrial concerns were built south of the station on the up side all of which were rail served.

A third signal box – Stowmarket Works – was opened to serve these facilities in 1941.

British Railways (1948-1994)
Following nationalisation in 1948, Stowmarket station became part of the Eastern Region of British Railways.
Stowmarket Works signal box closed in October 1957.

Some shunting at Stowmarket was carried out by horses as late as 1958.

The buildings, which were Grade II listed in 1972, were restored in 1987.

An empty coal train derailed on 2 March 1976 with 16 of 21 wagons derailing.

Goods traffic lasted until the mid-1970s, the yard being shunted by a Norwich-based British Rail Class 03 locomotive until January 1977.
Some ICI traffic lasted a few years longer. There was also a very short-lived milk service that ran in the summer of 1981 which originated at Chard Junction in the West Country  

The line through the station was electrified and resignalled by British Rail in 1985 using the 25 kV AC electric system. The first electric train ran on 6 April 1987 with the full electric service starting on 11 May 1987.

The privatisation era
In April 1994 Railtrack became responsible for the maintenance of the infrastructure. Railtrack was succeeded by Network Rail in 2002.

Passenger services have been operated by the following franchises:

 April 1994 to December 1996 - Operated as a non-privatised business unit under the InterCity name
 January 1997 to March 2004 - Anglia Railways (owned by GB Railways but bought out by FirstGroup in 2003)
 April 2004 to February 2012 - National Express East Anglia
 March 2013 to present - Abellio Greater Anglia

Description

Passenger station

As mentioned above the station buildings were listed in 1972 and restored in 1987. Historic England describes the station buildings thus:

"Red brick with gault brick dressings under roofs clad in machine tiles. 1-3 storeys on high basements. Composition, in Jacobean style, is symmetrical, comprising a central one storey and attic block linked by single-storey ranges to taller 2-3 storey side blocks. Central block with Dutch gables to west, north and south, the west one facing the entrance and with an attic window. Windows generally are ovolo-moulded cross casements, cornices are saw-toothed. 2 square one-storey pavilions flank main entrance right and left. Recessed linking blocks had retaining walls with taller central doorways enclosing forecourt, but this remains now only to south side. Main outer blocks with cross casements, Dutch gables to all faces (north return of north block with twin shaped gables), and frontal (west) polygonal towers with doors at the bases and pierced parapets at the top. Gabled roofs carry romantically-placed 2- and 3-flued stacks. Platform canopies supported on square section welded steel piers of late C20. The piers rise to timber braces within which are cast-iron scrolled brackets. Inner face of main west range with 4 arches right and left of central entrance to booking hall."

Nicklaus Pevsner described it as "an elaborate piece of Elizabethan architecture by Frederick J Barnes, 1849.  Red and yellow brick, symmetrical, with shaped gables and angle towers."

The Stowmarket area was controlled by two signal boxes – one at the station that exists today as a gate control box and the Yard Box to the south. A third called Stowmarket works existed 1941–1957.

There are two platforms linked by a footbridge (which was replaced in 1985 with a taller structure to allow for the electrification of the route). The original footbridge is preserved at Weybourne railway station on the North Norfolk Railway. The down platform was restricted to five coaches for many years but both platforms were lengthened prior to electrification in 1985.

Today (2016) there is a small convenience store is located on platform 2. Disabled access between platforms is possible using the Stowupland Road level crossing. The present bridge is set to be replaced with a new one with lifts, improving disabled access.

Most of the former railway land (goods sidings) is now given over for car parking for the station.

Goods facilities
The down side yard had an extensive array of sidings and a two-track wooden goods shed. Outbound goods traffic at Stowmarket was primarily agricultural in nature with coal being a major inward commodity.

The up side also had a number of sidings some of which were located behind the up platform. Gun cotton was produced here first by Prentices and later by the New Explosives Company Limited.

The latter siding was actually accessed from the down side sidings  of the British Acetate Silk Corporation Ltd (as it was in 1927 later part of ICI) and a short tunnel under the main line. The site had a number of standard gauge industrial locomotives between 1915 and 1931 although after that date it was shunted by LNER and then BR locomotives. Both sites had a narrow gauge tramways but it is unknown whether these had any locomotives.

The Stowmarket Down Goods Loop is home to the East-Anglian Rail-Head-Treatment-Trains, operated by Direct Rail Services in the Autumn months.

Other local rail served businesses included a brewery (Sutton & Phillips),a timber merchant (W R Hewitt siding built 1904), a Co-op milk depot (built 1934) and a manure works (Prentices built 1870).

Locomotive facilities
An inspection pit and coal stage were provided in the early 1920s – probably primarily used by the local shunting locomotive, generally a GER 0-6-0T engine such as a GER Class R24 (LNER Class J67) or similar undertook these duties.

Currently the sidings at Marsh Lane, south of the station and on the site of the former down side goods yard, are used by Direct Rail Services as a locomotive stabling point. A crew office is provided on platform 1.

Services

1850
The March 1850 Bradshaw's Guide saw Eastern Union Railway services to Stowmarket shown on page 33. Four weekday EUR trains from Colchester (where they connected to Eastern Counties Railway trains) to Norwich Victoria served Stowmarket. Connections for Bury St Edmunds were made at Haughley Junction just to the north. A similar service operated in the up direction and an arrival in London (via a change at Colchester) could be made at 1005.

1964
The September 1964 British Railways Eastern Region timetable saw three service groups regularly serving Stowmarket:
 Ipswich – Cambridge
 Liverpool Street – Norwich 
 Ipswich - Norwich all stations local service

In addition, there were a number of other (one off) cross-country trains including:
 Harwich Parkeston Quay – Manchester Piccadilly (the former North Country Continental)
 Harwich Town – Rugby (in fact an all stations service to Cambridge extended)
 Colchester to Glasgow Queen Street
 Liverpool Street – Peterborough (via Ipswich and Ely)

2016
Additionally, in the evening, some services are extended from Ipswich to Colchester and some trains towards Cambridge and Peterborough terminate at Bury St Edmunds. Limited additional services to/from Liverpool Street start or terminate at Stowmarket during rush hour.

References

Notes

External links

Railway stations in Suffolk
DfT Category C2 stations
Grade II listed buildings in Suffolk
Grade II listed railway stations
Former Great Eastern Railway stations
Railway stations in Great Britain opened in 1846
Greater Anglia franchise railway stations
Stowmarket